State Route 216 (SR 216) is a 17.7 mile long east-west state highway in West Tennessee, connecting Rives with Martin.

Route description

SR 216 begins as secondary highway in Obion County at an intersection with US 45W/SR 5/SR 21. It goes as Pleasant Hill Road to pass through the town of Rives before crossing the North Fork of the Obion River and becoming Rives Mount Pelia Road. The highway then winds its way southeast through farmland to cross into Weakley County. SR 216 becomes Mount Pelia Road as it passes through the community of Mount Pelia before winding its way eastward and entering Martin, where it passes through some neighborhoods before splitting off onto Baker Road. It then becomes concurrent with SR 43 (Skyhawk Parkway) as they bypass downtown and come to an interchange with US 45E and US 45E Business (Elm Street/SR 372). Prior to this point, the entire route of SR 216 is a two-lane highway. Here SR 43 becomes unsigned and follows US 45E south while SR 216 becomes an unsigned primary highway and follows US 45E north. They go east as a 4-lane divided freeway, having an interchange with Pair Road, before SR 216 comes to an end at an with SR 22 and SR 431, with US 45E continuing north along SR 22 north.

Major intersections

References

216
Transportation in Obion County, Tennessee
Transportation in Weakley County, Tennessee
Freeways in Tennessee